The Blue Texel is a Dutch breed of meat sheep. It is a colour variety of the Texel, which originates on the island of Texel in the Wadden Sea. It was established as a separate breed in 1983.

History 
The Blue Texel was first registered and recorded in the early 1970s in Holland when a blue lamb was born to white Texel parents. After this occurred, Texels were deliberately bred to give birth to blue lambs. By 1983 there were 11 flocks with a total of 213 blue texel sheep.

Breed standard 
 Head should be narrow with a white halter mark
 Flat poll with no wool and head covered in fine hair with white tips on the ears
 Medium-sized sheep with a well-muscled body
 Fleece must be dense 
 They should stand square and balanced
 Ideal color is a darker head and shoulder, light blue color on the back, and dark again around their back end. 
 Black fleece with little or no white markings is not acceptable

Distribution 
Blue Texels originated in Holland. They can now be found throughout Europe including Holland and The United Kingdom. The Blue Texel has not yet made its way to North America.

Uses 
Blue Texels are typically used as a terminal sire in commercial flocks to add muscle and other meat characteristics to the lambs. Their fleeces are also becoming more popular due to their unique colour pattern. Blue Texels are a new breed in the show ring and often catch the eye of the judge.

See also
 Beltex

References

External links

Sheep breeds
Sheep breeds originating in the Netherlands